Fort Wayne was a series of three successive military log stockades existing between 1794 and 1819 in the Miami Indian village of Kekionga, on the portage between the St. Mary's and St. Joseph Rivers in northeastern Indiana, in what is now the city of Fort Wayne. The fort succeeded the original Fort Miami, which originated as a French trading outpost around 1706.

The first fort with that name was built in 1794 by Captain Jean François Hamtramck under orders from General "Mad" Anthony Wayne as part of the campaign against the Miami during the Northwest Indian War. It was constructed to secure the territory gained in the Battle of Fallen Timbers, in which Wayne had recently been victorious. On October 22, 1794, with construction nearly complete, and in honor of the fourth anniversary of Harmar's Defeat, the fort was officially dedicated by the US Army in the early morning hours with fifteen cannon rounds to symbolize the fifteen states of the union. It was at this point that Colonel Hamtramck would name the fort, "Fort Wayne". 

On September 5, 1812, the Siege of Fort Wayne occurred as part of the War of 1812. After the war, settlements started growing up around the fort. The fort was a basic stockade with few buildings. The original site was located near the present-day intersection of Berry and Clay streets.

In 1819, the fort was abandoned following the cessation of Native hostilities, and the modern city of Fort Wayne was platted in 1823. A replica of the fort as it existed in 1815 (called "The Old Fort") was created in a different location in the city, and is now a tourist attraction.

Background
Fort Wayne was the successor to a series of French, and for a few small periods, British controlled forts named Fort Miami, which was originally built as a small trading post around 1706 by French Canadian soldier Jean Baptiste Bissot, Sieur de Vincennes.

History

Wayne's Legion arrived at Kekionga on 17 September 1794, and Wayne personally selected the site for the new U.S. fort.  Wayne wanted a strong fort built, capable of withstanding not only an Indian uprising, but a possible attack by the British from Fort Detroit.  The fort was finished by 17 October, and was capable of withstanding 24-pound cannons.  It was named Fort Wayne and placed under command of Major Jean François Hamtramck, who had been commandant of Fort Knox in Vincennes.  The fort was officially dedicated 22 October (the fourth anniversary of Harmar's Defeat), and the day is considered the founding of the modern city of Fort Wayne.

The garrison at Fort Wayne normally consisted of about 100 men and their families.  In 1796, the garrison was ordered to march down the Maumee River to counteract a British demonstration. The force received the transfer of Fort Miami (Ohio) from the British before Colonel Hamtramck was transferred to Fort Detroit - later the site of another Fort Wayne, and near the future town of Hamtramck, Michigan. Colonel David Strong, a veteran of the American Revolution and Wayne's Legion, succeeded him as commandant of Fort Wayne for two years, before transferring commands with Colonel Hamtramck in 1798.

Colonel Thomas Hunt—a veteran of the Battles of Lexington and Concord, Bunker Hill, and Wayne's Legion—took command of the fort on 16 May 1798, and built a substantial new fort several hundred yards north of the original, near the modern city's Old Fort Park. The new fort contained multiple guard houses and Indian "factories" (trading posts). The first fort was demolished about 1800.

During the War of 1812, Fort Dearborn (present-day Chicago) was evacuated and its residents tried to reach Fort Wayne under the direction of William Wells, but were massacred before they arrived. Fort Wayne was besieged next by the Indian forces of Tecumseh during the Siege of Fort Wayne. Captain James Rhea, who had retreated to his quarters on the grounds of being ill, was in charge of the fort and considered surrendering, but his two lieutenants relieved him of duty. General William Henry Harrison arrived on September 12, 1812 and broke the siege. Captain Rhea was formally relieved of duty and one of the lieutenants, named Ostrander, was given official command of the fort.  After the war, a town began growing around the fort. 

A third fort was built in 1815/16 by Major John Whistler. The fort was officially abandoned on April 19, 1819, and its contents shipped to Fort Detroit.  The last of the old fort was demolished in 1852 to make way in the town.

Commanders of Fort Wayne

References

Citations

Sources

Wayne
Wayne
Northwest Indian War
Buildings and structures in Fort Wayne, Indiana
Wayne
Wayne
Demolished buildings and structures in Indiana
Buildings and structures demolished in 1852